Douglas Edward Hopkins (23 December 1902 – 1992) was a cathedral organist, who served at Peterborough Cathedral and Canterbury Cathedral.

Background

Douglas Edward Hopkins, D.Mus, FRAM, FRCO, was born on 23 December 1902 in London.

He studied at the Royal Academy of Music and the Guildhall School of Music. He was a professor at the Royal Academy of Music where he taught organ and choir training.

Career

Sub-organist:
St Paul's Cathedral 1927 - 1946

Organist of:
Peterborough Cathedral 1946 - 1953
Canterbury Cathedral 1953 - 1955
St Marylebone Parish Church 1965 - 1971
Royal Memorial Chapel, Sandhurst 1971-1976

References

English classical organists
British male organists
Cathedral organists
1902 births
Alumni of the Royal Academy of Music
1992 deaths
20th-century classical musicians
20th-century English musicians
20th-century organists
20th-century British male musicians
Male classical organists